Cyclone Jones is a 1923 American silent Western film directed by Charles R. Seeling and starring Guinn 'Big Boy' Williams, Bill Patton and Kathleen Collins.

Cast
 Guinn 'Big Boy' Williams as Cyclone Jones 
 Bill Patton as Kirk Davis
 J.P. McKee as John Billings
 Kathleen Collins as Sylvia Billings
 Frank Alexander as Fatty Wirthing 
 Fred Burns as Jack Thompson

References

External links
 

1923 films
1923 Western (genre) films
American black-and-white films
Films directed by Charles R. Seeling
Silent American Western (genre) films
1920s English-language films
1920s American films